Phyllurus is a small genus of Australian leaf-tailed geckos, lizards in the family Carphodactylidae. Rarely seen outside their native habitat, they are notable for their highly effective camouflage which is in part aided by the spiny tubercles that cover every body part.

Most member species, except for P. caudiannulatus, P. gulbaru and P. kabikabi, have very flattened, leaf-shaped tails. Some of these species have recently been reassigned to the genus Saltuarius. The Phyllurus geckos resemble the Uroplatus geckos of Madagascar. This is an example of convergent evolution because they are not closely related. As of 2023, Scawfell Island leaf-tailed gecko is the last known species of gecko to be found in Australia.

Species
The following species are recognized as being valid.
Phyllurus amnicola Couper, Schneider, Hoskin & Covacevich, 2000  – Mount Elliot leaf-tailed gecko
Phyllurus caudiannulatus Covacevich, 1975 – Bulburin leaf-tailed gecko
Phyllurus championae Couper, Schneider, Hoskin & Covacevich, 2000– Champion's leaf-tailed gecko
Phyllurus gulbaru Hoskin, Couper & Schneider, 2003 – Gulbaru leaf-tailed gecko
Phyllurus isis Couper, Covacevich & Moritz, 1993 – Mount Blackwood leaf-tailed gecko
Phyllurus kabikabi Couper, Hamley & Hoskin, 2008 – Oakview leaf-tailed gecko
Phyllurus nepthys Couper, Covacevich & Moritz, 1993 – Eungella leaf-tailed gecko
Phyllurus ossa Couper, Covacevich & Moritz, 1993 – Mackay Coast leaf-tailed gecko
Phyllurus pinnaclensis Hoskin, Bertola & Higgie, 2019 – Pinnacles leaf-tailed gecko
Phyllurus platurus (Shaw, 1790) – broad-tailed gecko
 Phyllurus fimbriatus Hoskin, 2023 - Scawfell Island leaf-tailed gecko

The northern leaf-tailed gecko (previously Phyllurus cornutus Ogilby, 1892), is now placed in the genus Saltuarius.

Nota bene: A binomial authority in parentheses indicates that the species was originally described in a genus other than Phyllurus.

References

Further reading
Schinz HR (1822). Das Thierreich eingetheilt nach dem Bau der Thiere als Grundlage ihrer Naturgeschichte und der vergleichenden Anatomie von dem Hern Ritter von Cuvier. Zweiter Band [Volume 2]. Reptilien, Fische, Weichthiere, Ringelwürmer. Stuttgart and Tübingen: J.G. Cotta. xvi + 835 pp. (Phyllurus, new genus, p. 79). (in German and Latin).

 
Lizard genera
Taxa named by Heinrich Rudolf Schinz